António Calvário da Paz (born 17 October 1938) is a Portuguese singer and artist from the late 1950s and 1960s.

Life and career
Born in Lourenço Marques, Portuguese Mozambique, in Africa, still as a child, he settled with his family in Portugal's southern region of Algarve, in Europe, where he was raised. At 18 years old he moved from Portimão to Lisbon in order to continue his formal education and pursue a career as a singer. He represented Portugal in the 1964 Eurovision Song Contest, in Denmark, with the song "Oração" (Portuguese for "prayer"). Other music successes of his include the songs Regresso, O Meu Chapéu, Sabor a Sal, Perdão para Nós Dois, Bom Dia, Meu Coração de Madeira, Namorados de Domingo and Mocidade Mocidade. Calvário appeared also in a number of films. He has resided between Costa da Caparica in Almada municipality, near Lisbon, where he lived with his mother who died in 2004, and Portimão, Algarve region, in southern Portugal.

References

1938 births
Living people
20th-century Portuguese male singers
Eurovision Song Contest entrants for Portugal
Eurovision Song Contest entrants of 1964